The Yamaha FX-1 is a stand-up type personal watercraft (PWC) made by Yamaha Motor Corporation. Part of Yamaha's WaveRunner line of watercraft, it was introduced in 1994 and discontinued in 1995.  It was built in very limited numbers and only around 1500 total were made.

It has the same 701cc 61x single carb engine as the 1994 SuperJet but has a lighter and narrower fiberglass hull (compared to the SMC hull on the SuperJet).

The FX-1 is similar in size to stand-up skis from the late 1980s and early 1990s and is a departure from the larger race skis that were being introduced at around the same time.

Motor

 Displacement: 701cc, Inline two-cylinder, two-stroke (61X cylinder, 61X cases)
Rated Power Output: 63 hp
 Premix ratio, gas/oil: 50:1
 Single Carb (Mikuni SBN44) with twin stainless steel 8-petal reed valves
 RPM Limiter: 7050-7150 rpm

Chassis

 Length (in): 83.9
 Width (in): 28
 Height (in): 26.0
 Weight, dry (lb): 267

Chassis specifications of the SuperJet vs. FX-1
(Taken from the 1994 Yamaha water craft catalog.)
 88.2 vs 83.9" length
 26.8 vs 24.8" width
 26.0 vs 26.6" height
 290 vs 267 lbs weight
144mm pump vs. 122mm pump

FX-1